Nigel Romick  (born April 22, 1991) is a Canadian football defensive lineman for the Ottawa Redblacks of the Canadian Football League (CFL).

University career
Romick played CIS football with the Saint Mary's Huskies from 2010 to 2013.

Professional career
Following his university career, Romick was selected by the expansion Ottawa Redblacks in the third round, 23rd overall, in the 2014 CFL Draft and signed with the team on May 26, 2014. He made the team's active roster following training camp and played in his first professional regular season game on July 3, 2014 against the Winnipeg Blue Bombers. In his rookie year, he played in 11 games where he recorded four special teams tackles.

In 2015, Romick played in all 18 regular season games where he recorded his first two career defensive tackles and also had 17 special teams tackles. He also played in his first playoff game in the team's East Final victory over the Hamilton Tiger-Cats. He then played in his first Grey Cup game, but the Redblacks lost the 103rd Grey Cup to the Edmonton Eskimos. During the 2016 preseason, Romick suffered a ruptured bicep injury and missed the team's first 12 games of the season. He played in two games where he had two special teams tackles, but then suffered a broken thumb in the second game and was out for the rest of the season. While on the injured list, the Redblacks won the 104th Grey Cup game and Romick won the first Grey Cup championship of his career. He re-signed with the Redblacks on December 12, 2016, to a two-year contract extension.

Romick returned healthy in 2017 and played in all 18 regular season games where he had 19 special teams tackles. In 2018, he had a career-high 21 special teams tackles en route to becoming Ottawa's all time leader in special teams tackles. He also played in his second Grey Cup game that year, but the Redblacks lost the 106th Grey Cup to the Calgary Stampeders. 

Romick re-signed with the Redblacks to a one-year contract extension on January 15, 2019. The Redblacks struggled in 2019 in a three-win season, but Romick recorded a career-high eight defensive tackles to go along with 17 special teams tackles. He did not play in 2020 due to the cancellation of the 2020 CFL season.

Romick was featured more on defense in 2021 and recorded his first career sack on October 11, 2021 when he brought down Montreal Alouettes quarterback, Vernon Adams. He finished the year having played in 10 regular season games and had three defensive tackles, 12 special teams tackles, and one sack.

Personal life
Romick and his fiancée, Melissa Lamb, have one son, Luca, who was born on December 6, 2019. Romick volunteered as a firefighter in 2020 and plans on pursuing a career in firefighting after his football career is finished.

References

External links
Ottawa Redblacks bio 

Living people
1991 births
Players of Canadian football from Ontario
Canadian football defensive linemen
Saint Mary's Huskies football players
Ottawa Redblacks players
Sportspeople from Thunder Bay